Michael James Thompson (born November 5, 1976) is an American politician serving in the Mississippi State Senate from the 48th district since 2020.

Early life and education 
Thompson was born in Metairie, Louisiana and attended the Catholic boarding school Saint Stanislaus in Bay St. Louis, Mississippi. He graduated from Texas A&M University. He entered law school at Loyola University New Orleans College of Law, graduating with a Juris Doctor. He was admitted to the Mississippi Bar on April 26, 2011.

Career 
Thompson worked on tugboats and other supply vessels in the Gulf of Mexico, working his way up to captain. After graduating from law school, he worked for a regional defense law firm, representing small businesses.

Thompson ran for election to the Mississippi State Senate in 2019, where he earned 59.3% of the vote in the Republican primary and 51.6% in the general election, flipping the district from the Democratic incumbent; he assumed office on January 7, 2020.

As of 2020, in the Senate, he chairs the Investigate State Offices committee and is the vice-chair for the Ports and Marine Resources committee. He is a member of these additional committees: Constitution; Environment Protection, Conservation, and Water Resources; Finance; Gaming; Highway and Transportation; Judiciary, Division B; and Tourism.

Political positions 
In 2020, he voted to change the Mississippi state flag.

Personal life 
Thompson is married and has two children. He is Christian.

References 

Living people
Republican Party Mississippi state senators
21st-century American politicians
Texas A&M University alumni
Loyola University New Orleans College of Law alumni
1976 births
People from Metairie, Louisiana